1783 in sports describes the year's events in world sport.

Boxing
Events
 June — Tom Johnson defeated Jack Jurvis at Walworth in a 15 minute fight. It's not known if this was for the championship or not.

Cricket
Events
 A report in the Whitehall Evening Post stated that "the 3rd Duke of Dorset’s cricketing establishment, exclusive of any betting or consequential entertainment, is said to exceed £1,000 a year".
England
 Most runs – John Small 157 
 Most wickets – William Bullen 18

Horse racing
England
 The Derby – Saltram
 The Oaks – Maid of the Oaks
 St Leger Stakes – Phoenomenon

References

 
1783